Woodyardville (also Feltons Store) is an unincorporated community in Pulaski County, Arkansas, United States.

Notes

Unincorporated communities in Pulaski County, Arkansas
Unincorporated communities in Arkansas